The 2001 Davidoff Swiss Indoors was a men's tennis tournament played on indoor carpet courts at the St. Jakobshalle in Basel in Switzerland and was part of the International Series of the 2001 ATP Tour. The tournament ran from 22 October through 28 October 2001. Tim Henman won the singles title.

Finals

Singles

 Tim Henman defeated  Roger Federer 6–3, 6–4, 6–2
 It was Henman's 2nd title of the year and the 11th of his career.

Doubles

 Ellis Ferreira /  Rick Leach defeated  Mahesh Bhupathi /  Leander Paes 7–6(7–3), 6–4
 It was Ferreira's 1st title of the year and the 16th of his career. It was Leach's 2nd title of the year and the 42nd of his career.

References

External links
 Official website 
 ATP tournament profile

 
Davidoff Swiss Indoors
Swiss Indoors
Davidoff Swiss Indoors
Davidoff Swiss Indoors